The Islamic University in Uganda (IUIU) is a multi-campus university offering courses at certificate, diploma, undergraduate and postgraduate levels.

History
The idea to start IUIU was conceived at the second summit of the Organisation of the Islamic Conference in 1974. The university was inaugurated in February 1988 with 80 students. The main objective of the university is to serve the higher education needs of the English-speaking Muslim community in Southern and Eastern Africa. The  university also enrolls non-Muslim  students, who are free to practice their different religions.

University campuses
As of December 2014, IUIU had four campuses:

The coordinates of the main campus are 1°06'02.0"N, 34°10'25.0"E (Latitude:1.100556; Longitude:34.173611).
This campus is for female students only. 

Academics
The university has the following faculties, as of January 2021:

Faculty of Law
Faculty of Health Sciences
Faculty of Science
Faculty of Education
Faculty of Management Studies
Faculty of Arts & Social Sciences
Faculty of Islamic Studies & Arabic Language 
Faculty of Health Sciences
Faculty of Technology & Engineering (Expected)
Center for Postgraduate Studies.

Students

Islamic University in Uganda, affectionately called IUIU boasts, has students from across the African continent. The first West African student to be admitted to the university was Mr. Abdul Ishaq Hussein from Ghana between  1989 and 1990. He was later followed by Mr. Ahmed Gedel, also from Ghana and four other Nigerians including Imam Rufai, Ismail, Dr. Uba Inuwa and Dr. Taufik.

There were many other West African students from Mali, the Gambia, famous of whom is Alieu K. Jammeh, who served as Minister of Sports under Yahya Jammeh. He is currently Gambia's High Commissioner to Guinea.

There were students from Malawi, Kenya, Tanzania, Somalia, South Africa, Djibouti and Eritrea as of July 1998.

University halls

Currently, the university has four very competitive halls of residence.

Umar-Khadija, the oldest, is also arguably the most successful hall of residence in sports activities. Two West African students were privileged to serve in high positions of the hall. They are Abdul Razak Abdul Hamid Musah, chairman and Anas Abubakar as the general secretary in 1998. Their rise to these positions was mainly because they were among three of the best table tennis players the university had ever produced. The third player was Dr. Asiso. Suraqa. He was probably the best table tennis player on campus.

However, the first West African Chairman of a hall of residence of the university was Nurudeen Abdul Hamid of Ali- Hafswa Hall.

The other halls are Uth-Fat Hall and Abu-Aisha Hall.

Notable alumni
Faridah Nakazibwe

See also
 List of universities in Uganda
 List of law schools in Uganda
 List of medical schools in Uganda
 List of business schools in Uganda
 List of university leaders in Uganda

References

External links
 Islamic University In Uganda Requests For Nigerian Lecturers
 Islamic University in Uganda Homepage
Universities of OIC Member Countries Database of SESRIC 

 
Uganda
Organisation of Islamic Cooperation
Educational institutions established in 1988
Bugisu sub-region
Association of African Universities
1988 establishments in Uganda